The Canon FX is a 35 mm SLR manufactured by Canon Inc. of Japan and introduced in April 1964.  It introduced the Canon FL lens mount, the successor to the Canon R.

The camera has a built-in lightmeter using a CdS photocell mounted on the photographer's left-hand side; unlike later cameras, it does not meter through the taking lens.  A lever switched between low sensitivity for bright subjects (EV 9–18) and high sensitivity for dark subjects (EV 1-10) (at ISO 100).  Film speeds supported are ISO 10 through 800.

The shutter is a horizontally-traveling focal plane shutter supporting speeds between 1/1000 and 1 second in full stop increments, selected by a dial on the top plate on the photographer's right.  The X-sync speed for flash is 1/55 sec.; flash support was through a PC socket on the front of the body.

The viewfinder uses a glass pentaprism and gives coverage of 90% of the frame vertically and 93% horizontally, with a 0.9× magnification (with a 50 mm standard lens).

The FX was available with either silver or black metal parts. Obviously there could be a few hidden ones in cupboards and dens, however there were only two known all-black models until November 2014;There are now at least three, two are owned by a private collector in Pennsylvania, USA and another one by a private collector in Koromilia, Kilkis, Greece.

References 
Canon's new Museum site is https://global.canon/en/c-museum/ and the link to the Canon FX is https://global.canon/en/c-museum/product/film49.html

Canon FL cameras